Toul Cathedral (Cathédrale Saint-Étienne de Toul) is a Roman Catholic church in Toul, Lorraine, France. It is a classic example of late Gothic architecture in the Flamboyant style. The cathedral has one of the biggest cloisters in France.

The cathedral was formerly the seat of the Diocese of Toul. Established in 365, it was annexed in 1824 to the Diocese of Nancy, which in 1777 had been formed from the Diocese of Toul. Since 1824, the diocese has been known as the Diocese of Nancy-Toul,

Architecture
The cathedral has significant elements of the late Gothic Flamboyant style of architecture.

The towers of the facade measuring 65 meters high,  the nave, 100 m long and a vault height of 30 meters and a transept 56 meters wide. Despite construction over more than three centuries, the building's facade has a homogeneity of style. The 13th century saw the construction of the choir, the transept, the last section of the nave and the first row of the gallery of the cloisters.

A remarkable element is the transept which embraces larges windows over nearly the entire height of the transept wall.

The four bays of the nave were built in the 14th century,

In the 15th century the magnificent Gothic façade and the first two bays of the nave were built. In the 16th century two Renaissance chapels were added to the front of the north and south aisles of the nave. The Chapel of All Saints, became the burial of Jean Forget, chaplain and cantor of the chapter of canons.  The Chapel of Bishops with its flat coffered roof, supported by simple low arches - has been closed for fifty years, awaiting restoration.

During the French Revolution the sculpted figures of the facade were destroyed. A bombing during the Second World War destroyed the roof and the organ. A major restoration campaign began in the 1980s.

Generally the cathedral is a synthesis of the influence of the Verdun Cathedral choir for the design of crypt and flanked by towers and facade of Reims.

The Touloise School
Alain Villes in his work on the Toul Cathedral defines the beginning of a school that creates Touloise Gothic style of the thirteenth century.

Other features
Another touloise effect appears in the broad facade of Flamboyant Gothic style. The decoration of the towers of the cathedral is likely inspired by those of the Church of St. Martin de Pont-à-Mousson.  The style of belltowers has definitely influenced the architecture of the contemporaneous St. Gengoult college of Toul and also later in the St. Leon church of Nancy's neo-Gothic style.

As an influence on the architecture of the area
The Cathedral of Toul is the first Gothic construction started in Holy Roman Empire and therefore influenced many buildings of the empire, beginning with Lorraine and even Champagne:
The  which the whole plan is very similar to that of Toul, although smaller;
St. Gengoult college of Toul, the site was a contemporary of the cathedral,
The choir of Notre-Dame-la-Ronde (then included in the Metz Cathedral) follows the plan of the apse of Toul, but without towers
It is the same for the church Sainte-Ségolène Metz which generally follows the cathedral floorplan but without the towers.  Also for the Basilica of St. Maurice d'Epinal. Both fit the model of the choir and side chapels opening into the transept.

Chapel of the Bishop
The chapel of Bishops is a Renaissance chapel whose unique coffered ceiling and flat roof contains no internal support. Since the end of World War II, the chapel awaits restoration and reopening to the public.

Gallery

See also
Pierre Camille Le Moine

References

External links
 Catholic Encyclopedia: Diocese of Nancy, incl. Diocese of Toul

Roman Catholic cathedrals in France
Churches in Meurthe-et-Moselle